Paralida triannulata is a moth in the family Gelechiidae. It was described by Clarke in 1958. It is found in Japan and Taiwan.

The wingspan is 22–24 mm. The forewings are buff shaded with olivaceous.

The larvae feed on Melia azedarach var. japonica.

References

Chelariini
Moths described in 1958